Extricate is the 12th album by post-punk band the Fall. It was made immediately after bandleader Mark E. Smith divorced guitarist Brix Smith. Brix's departure helped define the sound of this album: her background vocals and relatively pop-oriented guitar, which had become mainstays of The Fall, are noticeably absent in this release. In one of the more unusual events in the group's career, she was replaced by founding former member Martin Bramah, who had previously left the group in 1979 to form his own group Blue Orchids.

Lead-off single "Telephone Thing" could have been seen as a nod to the Manchester scene of the time as the sound is quite similar to the dance-influenced music that was being released by Happy Mondays and The Stone Roses in 1989. However, its origins were in Smith's previous collaboration with Coldcut on their track "I'm in Deep", which, in turn, led to Coldcut producing the track and "Black Monk Theme Part II", one of two tracks by 60s garage band The Monks to be covered on the album (the other being "Black Monk Theme" – The Fall retitled both tracks). Elsewhere, Bramah, appearing on his first Fall album since Live at the Witch Trials adds a distinctly raw, even rockabilly sound to some of the songs. However, the album's best-known track was one of the least typical of the group's catalogue: "Bill Is Dead", a slow-paced tender love song which topped John Peel's Festive Fifty that year, the only occasion in the DJ's lifetime when his favourite band would do so. Although originally conceived by Smith and Craig Scanlon as a parody of The Smiths, Smith changed lyrical tack when he decided Scanlon's music deserved better, delivering a highly personal lyric. However, at Smith's insistence, it was not released as a single.

The critical reception to Extricate was largely positive, with Melody Maker suggesting that it was "possibly their finest yet" and NME giving the album a full 10/10. During the Australian leg of the tour accompanying the album, both Martin Bramah and Marcia Schofield were sacked from the group.

The album was re-released in an expanded and re-mastered edition by Universal in May 2007.

Track listing

Original UK LP

CD and cassette editions

Of the four extra tracks added, "Arms Control Poseur" and "Black Monk Theme, Part II" were released as B-sides to "Popcorn Double Feature", the former in an alternate version. "British People in Hot Weather" was released as the B-side to "Telephone Thing".

2007 reissue

Disc 1 
 as per original UK LP

Personnel
The Fall
Mark E. Smith – vocals
Martin Bramah – guitar, backing vocals
Craig Scanlon – guitar
Steve Hanley – bass guitar
Marcia Schofield  – keyboards, percussion, backing vocals
Simon Wolstencroft – drums
Additional personnel
Kenny Brady – fiddle
Charlotte Bill – flute, oboe
Mike Edwards (of Jesus Jones) – guitar on "Popcorn Double Feature"
Craig Leon – backing vocals, organ
Cassell Webb (wife of Craig Leon; credited as "Castle") – backing vocals, organ
Technical
Craig Leon – production, mixing 
Adrian Sherwood – production, mixing 
Coldcut – production, mixing 
Mark E. Smith – production, mixing 
Alaistar – engineering
George Shilling – engineering
Ian Gillespie – engineering 
"A bunch of guys in ponytails" – engineering
Anthony Frost – front cover painting
Bob Berry – front cover painting photograph
Pointblanc – artwork
Paul Cox – band photography

References

1990 albums
The Fall (band) albums
Albums produced by Craig Leon
Albums produced by Adrian Sherwood
Fontana Records albums